Amy N. Bauernschmidt is a United States Navy officer. She is the first woman to serve as the executive officer and then as the commanding officer of a U.S. Navy aircraft carrier.

Early life and education
Bauernschmidt was raised in Milwaukee, Wisconsin and attended the United States Naval Academy. Six months before she graduated, the U.S. Congress passed legislation allowing women to serve on Navy combatant ships. She graduated in May 1994 with a B.S. degree in ocean engineering. On her first assignment as a Naval Academy midshipman, she chose aviation. After completing flight school, she was designated a naval aviator in 1996. She then learned to fly helicopters and also became a flight instructor.

Bauernschmidt later earned an M.A. degree in national security and strategic studies from the Naval War College.

Career
Trained as a helicopter pilot, Bauernschmidt served with the "Wolfpack" of HSL-45 on the destroyer  and the "Warlords" of HSL-51 on the aircraft carrier . She later served as executive officer and then commanding officer of the "Spartans" of HSM-70 on the aircraft carrier . In September 2016, after completing nuclear power school, Bauernschmidt became the executive officer of USS Abraham Lincoln. On 5 August 2019, she assumed command of the amphibious transport dock . On 19 August 2021, Bauernschmidt became the commanding officer of USS Abraham Lincoln. After she received her Masters degree in strategic studies she also served at the U.S. Secretary of State's Office of Global Women's Issues.

On January 3, 2022, USS Abraham Lincoln deployed from Naval Air Station North Island under the command of Bauernschmidt.

In February 2023, Bauernschmidt was nominated for promotion to rear admiral (lower half).

References

Year of birth missing (living people)
Living people
Place of birth missing (living people)
People from Milwaukee
United States Naval Academy alumni
Women United States Naval Aviators
Aviators from Wisconsin
Naval War College alumni
Recipients of the Legion of Merit
United States Navy captains
21st-century American women